Ladki Jawan Ho Gayi is a 1977 Bollywood film directed by Anand Dasani.

Cast   
Sujit Kumar   
Manorama

Music
"Ek Paheli Tum Se Punchu" - Kishore Kumar, Asha Bhosle
"Saath Hum Tum Chale The Yahi To Kahi" - Mohammed Rafi
"Ek To Vaisi Hi Deewani" - Asha Bhosle
"Jawani Hoti Hai Sau Aftaab Ka Jaadu" - Asha Bhosle, Mahendra Kapoor

External links
 

1977 films
Films scored by Sonik-Omi
1970s Hindi-language films